The Agaminae are a subfamily of reptiles in the family Agamidae.

Genera
Listed alphabetically:
Genus Acanthocercus
Genus Agama
Genus Bufoniceps (Laungwala long-headed lizard)
Genus Coryphophylax
Genus Laudakia (Asian rock agamas)
Genus Paralaudakia - sometimes included in  Laudakia (Asian rock agamas)
Genus Phrynocephalus (toadhead agamas)
Genus Pseudotrapelus
Genus Trapelus
Genus Xenagama

References

External links

 Agaminae, The Reptile Database

Agamidae
Taxa named by John Edward Gray
Reptile subfamilies